The 35th Annual American Music Awards took place on November 18, 2007 at the Nokia Theatre L.A. Live in Los Angeles, California. The ceremony was  hosted by Jimmy Kimmel.

Performers

Winners and nominees
Winners are highlighted in boldface.

References
2007 American Music Awards at ABC.com (outdated link)
CBSNews.com list of 2007 winners & nominees
T-Mobile Text-In Award nominees (idolstalker.com; deleted from ABC site)

2007
2007 music awards